Masumabad (also Romanized as Ma‘şūmābād; also known as Mūsūmābād) is a village in Jafarabad Rural District, Jafarabad District, Qom County, Qom Province, Iran. At the 2006 census, its population was 27, in 6 families.

References 

Populated places in Qom Province